T-120 was a minesweeper of the Soviet Navy during World War II and the Cold War. Upon completion she was transferred to the Soviet Union under Lend-Lease as T-120; she was never returned to the United States. Because of the Cold War, the U.S. Navy was unaware of this fate and the vessel remained on the American Naval Vessel Register until she was struck on 1 January 1983.

Career 
Assail was laid down on 1 November 1942 at Tampa, Florida, by the Tampa Shipbuilding Co.; launched on 27 December 1942; sponsored by Miss M. T. Hicks; and completed on 5 October 1943. She was transferred to the Soviet Union on the day she was completed under the lend-lease program, and she served the Soviet Navy as T-120 until she was torpedoed and sunk 24 September 1944 in the Kara Sea by German submarine .

Never returned, Assail was carried on the American Naval Vessel Register as MSF-147 after 7 February 1955 until struck on 1 January 1983.

References

External links
 NavSource Online: Mine Warfare Vessel Photo Archive – Assail (MSF 147) – ex-AM-147 – ex-AMc-124

Admirable-class minesweepers
Ships built in Tampa, Florida
1942 ships
World War II minesweepers of the United States
Admirable-class minesweepers of the Soviet Navy
World War II minesweepers of the Soviet Union
Ships sunk by German submarines in World War II
Maritime incidents in September 1944
Shipwrecks in the Kara Sea
World War II shipwrecks in the Arctic Ocean